Madanpokhara  is a village development committee in Palpa District in the Lumbini Zone of southern Nepal. At the time of the 1991 Nepal census it had a population of 6269 people living in 1148 individual households.

Media
To Promote local culture Madanpokhara has one FM radio station Radio Madanpokhara - 106.9 MHz Which is a Community radio Station.

References

Populated places in Palpa District